Adolfosee is a lake in North Rhine-Westphalia, Germany. At an elevation of 39 m, its surface area is 0.307 km².

Lakes of North Rhine-Westphalia
LAdolfosee